Berserker (also known as Berserker: The Nordic Curse) is a 1987 American slasher film written and directed by Jefferson Richard. The film centers on a group of campers who are stalked and murdered by a Viking berserker.

Plot

According to an old Nordic legend, a Berserker was a bloodthirsty warrior who ate human flesh, was forbidden a restful death and fated to be reincarnated in their blood kin. A summer camp accidentally stumbles across the Berserker legend when it arises in Rainbow Valley, an area settled by Norwegian immigrants. The camp is abuzz with rumours of a wild bear killing people in the area, including speculation about an old couple who get lost. But is it really a bear?

Cast
 Greg Dawson as Josh Winter
 Joseph Alan Johnson as Mike Stone
 Rodney Montague as Larry Fishman
 Valerie Sheldon as Kathy
 Shannon Engemann as Kristi
 Beth Toussaint as Shelly
 Mike Riley as Berserker
 John F. Goff as Officer Walt Hill
 George "Buck" Flower as Pappy Nyquist
 Oscar Rowland as Homer Roberts
 Beverly Rowland as Edna Roberts

Production

Parts of the film were shot at Big Cottonwood Canyon in Utah.

Release

Home media
The film was released on DVD by Quantum Leap on October 22, 2001. It was later released by Hollywood DVD on August 2, 2004. Vinegar Syndrome released the film on Blu-ray in 2019.

Reception

Andrew Smith from Popcorn Pictures awarded the film a score of 3/10, writing, Berserker sounded great and could have become a little slasher gem but the lack of the berserker on-screen is disappointing and ‘Gentle Ben’ the bear doesn’t have any need to be in here. One to avoid unless you have a burning desire to see every 80s slasher film". Todd Martin from HorrorNews.net offered the film similar criticism, calling it "a boring, confusing, hokey, mess of a film". Will and Roni agreed that the Viking angle was underplayed.

References

External links
 
 
 

1987 films
1987 horror films
1980s slasher films
American slasher films
American supernatural horror films
Films shot in Utah
Backwoods slasher films
Films set in forests
Supernatural slasher films
Films set in Utah
1980s English-language films
1980s American films